The Lewis Miller Cottage is a historic house at Whitfield and Vincent Avenues, on the grounds of the Chautauqua Institute in Chautauqua, New York.  Built in 1874, it was the residence of Lewis Miller, founder and leader of the Chautauqua movement.  It was named a National Historic Landmark in 1965 for its association with Miller, and is included in the larger Chautauqua Institution Historic District, also a National Historic Landmark.

Description and history
The Lewis Miller Cottage stands in the village of Chautauqua, at the northwest corner of Vincent and Whitfield Avenues.  It is a two-story wood-frame structure, with a broad gabled roof showing Stick style woodwork and large supporting brackets.  It has a symmetrical front facade, with sash windows flanking the center entrance on the ground floor, and paired sash windows on the second floor, flanking a center doorway that provides access to the second-story balcony.  The first-floor porch and second-floor balcony both have gingerbread balustrades.

The cottage is a prefabricated structure, built in 1874 and delivered here for Lewis Miller (1829-1899), founder and leader of the Chautauqua movement.  It is one of the first buildings to be erected on what became the grounds of the Chautauqua Institution, founded by Miller and John Heyl Vincent in 1874.  The Chautauqua movement, which reached its height early in the 20th century, was a national movement of adult education and enrichment programs which is still active at a smaller scale. The house was, as of its designation as a National Historic Landmark in 1989, still owned by Miller's family.

See also

List of National Historic Landmarks in New York
National Register of Historic Places in Chautauqua County, New York

References

External links
 Lewis Miller Cottage (3 photos), at Historic American Buildings Survey

Houses on the National Register of Historic Places in New York (state)
National Historic Landmarks in New York (state)
Houses completed in 1874
Houses in Chautauqua County, New York
Historic district contributing properties in New York (state)
National Register of Historic Places in Chautauqua County, New York
Chautauqua Institution